F1 Manager 2022 is the official racing management simulation game of the 2022 Formula One, Formula 2, and Formula 3 championships developed and published by Frontier Developments. It is the first installment in the F1 Manager series and the first licensed manager game since F1 Manager by EA Sports. The game was released for PlayStation 4, PlayStation 5, Windows, Xbox One, and Xbox Series X/S on 30 August 2022.

Gameplay 
As a racing management game, F1 Manager 2022 offers a more detailed career layer in comparison to the My Team mode that Codemasters introduced in F1 2020. The game provides a strategy editor, where player can schedule pit stops, tyres, and pace for each stint. The game features parts development, cost cap, ERS as well as onboard cameras used in real life by Formula One teams. It also features the professional English commentator voices of Karun Chandhok and David Croft, as well as the opening titles for Formula One broadcasts shown after the Frontier Developments logo, while the transitions are recreated while being more faithful to the Formula One broadcasts. The game includes real engineers and drivers from Formula One, Formula 2 and Formula 3. Team radios from real Formula One drivers and race engineers are available as well. Red flags are also featured.

Development and release 
F1 Manager 2022 was officially announced in March 2022. It is the first video game in the F1 Manager series, which holds the official license of the Formula One, Formula 2, and Formula 3 championships from 2022 to 2025. It is also the first Formula One licensed management game since F1 Manager of EA Sports in 2000. The game is developed with Unreal Engine 4. It is developed and published by Frontier Developments, a British video game developer known for titles such as Elite Dangerous, Planet Coaster, Planet Zoo, and Jurassic World Evolution. The game was released on PlayStation 4, PlayStation 5, Windows, Xbox One, and Xbox Series X/S on 30 August 2022. Players who pre-order the game were able to pre-access to the game five days earlier on 25 August 2022. On 28 October 2022, Frontier Developments announced that they will cease development and support just two months after the initial release; this decision to stop development was met with negative reception from players, who had reported bugs in the game, and Frontier decided to backtrack on their previous statement to continue pushing updates for the title.

Reception 

F1 Manager 2022 received "generally favorable" reviews for Windows and Xbox Series X/S according to review aggregator Metacritic; the PlayStation 5 received "mixed or average" reviews.

It was the fourth best-selling retail game in the United Kingdom in its week of release. The game sold below Frontier's expectations, selling around 600,000 units by January 2023. Despite the game's underperformance, Frontier reiterated their committment to the franchise, describing the title as "a good first game in an important new annual franchise".

References

External links 

 

2022 video games
Frontier Developments games
PlayStation 4 games
PlayStation 5 games
Single-player video games
Sports management video games
Unreal Engine games
Video games set in 2022
Video games set in Australia
Video games set in Austria
Video games set in Azerbaijan
Video games set in Bahrain
Video games set in Belgium
Video games set in Brazil
Video games set in Canada
Video games set in France
Video games set in Hungary
Video games set in Italy
Video games set in Japan
Video games set in Mexico
Video games set in Miami
Video games set in Monaco
Video games set in the Netherlands
Sports video games set in Saudi Arabia
Video games set in Singapore
Video games set in Spain
Video games set in Texas
Video games set in the United Arab Emirates
Video games set in England
Windows games
Xbox One games
Xbox Series X and Series S games
Video games developed in the United Kingdom